As of July 2016, the International Union for Conservation of Nature (IUCN) lists 5278 data deficient invertebrate species. 29% of all evaluated invertebrate species are listed as data deficient. 
The IUCN also lists 57 invertebrate subspecies as data deficient.

No subpopulations of invertebrates have been evaluated by the IUCN.

This is a complete list of data deficient invertebrate species and subspecies as evaluated by the IUCN.

Nemertea species
Argonemertes stocki

Annelids

Onychophora
Mesoperipatus tholloni

Molluscs
There are 1988 mollusc species and 40 mollusc subspecies assessed as data deficient.

Gastropods
There are 1526 gastropod species and 37 gastropod subspecies assessed as data deficient.

Vetigastropoda
Teinostoma fernandesi
Teinostoma funiculatum

Stylommatophora
Stylommatophora includes the majority of land snails and slugs. There are 392 species and 32 subspecies in the order Stylommatophora assessed as data deficient.

Partulids

Subulinids

Species

Subspecies
Opeas nothapalinus crenatum
Pseudoglessula leroyi fasciata

Achatinellids

Endodontids

Charopids

Helicarionids

Orthalicids

Euconulids

Rhytidids

Streptaxids

Species

Subspecies

Zonitids

Pupillids

Polygyrids

Species

Subspecies

Helminthoglyptids

Species
Shasta sideband  (Monadenia troglodytes)
Subspecies

Camaenids

Lauriids

Vertiginids

Bradybaenids

Species

Subspecies
Euhadra scaevola mikawa

Helicids

Hygromiids

Enids

Other Stylommatophora

Species

Subspecies
Idaho banded mountain snail  (Oreohelix idahoensis idahoensis)
Carinated striate banded mountain snail  (Oreohelix strigosa goniogyra)

Littorinimorpha
There are 565 species and one subspecies in the order Littorinimorpha assessed as data deficient.

Strombids
Ophioglossolambis violacea

Pomatiids

Hydrobiids

Cochliopids

Bithyniids

Species

Subspecies
Gabbiella humerosa tanganyicensis

Moitessieriids

Assimineids

Pomatiopsids

Lithoglyphids

Amnicolids

Stenothyrids

Iravadiids

Truncatellids

Sorbeoconcha
There are 97 species and one subspecies in the order Sorbeoconcha assessed as data deficient.

Batillarids
Batillaria mutata

Pleurocerids

Melanopsids

Semisulcospirids
Oasis juga  (Juga laurae)

Thiarids

Pachychilids

Paludomids

Species

Subspecies
Cleopatra bulimoides pauli

Architaenioglossa
There are 106 species and one subspecies in the order Architaenioglossa assessed as data deficient.

Neocyclotids

Cyclophorids

Species

Subspecies
Chamalychaeus itonis nakashimai

Pupinids

Diplommatinids

Aciculids

Viviparids

Ampullariids

Lower Heterobranchia species

Cycloneritimorpha
There are 30 species and two subspecies in the order Cycloneritimorpha assessed as data deficient.

Helicinids

Species

Subspecies
Pleuropoma zigzac ponapense
Pleuropoma zigzac zigzac

Hydrocenids

Neritids

Hygrophila species
There are 197 Hygrophila species assessed as data deficient.

Physids

Acroloxids

Planorbids

Lymnaeids

Chilinids

Latiids
Latia lateralis

Neogastropoda
There are 113 species in the order Neogastropoda assessed as data deficient.

Turrids

Marginellids

Buccinids

Muricids

Conids

Eupulmonata

Archaeopulmonata
Salinator sanchezi
Salinator swatowensis

Bivalvia
There are 171 species and three subspecies in the class Bivalvia assessed as data deficient.

Pectinida
Nodipecten magnificus

Unionida
There are 95 species in the order Unionoida assessed as data deficient.

Margaritiferids
Margaritifera dahurica
Margaritifera laevis

Unionids

Hyriids

Iridinids

Mycetopodids
Anodontites elongatus
Anodontites trigonus

Veneroida
There are 74 species and three subspecies in the order Veneroida assessed as data deficient.

Dreissenids
Dreissena iconica

Sphaeriids

Species

Subspecies
Musculium hartmanni naivashaens

Cyrenids

Species

Subspecies
Corbicula fluminalis cunningtoni
Corbicula fluminalis tanganyicensis

Donacids

Solecurtids
Novaculina siamensis

Mytilida
Sinomytilus morrisoni

Cephalopods
There are 291 cephalopod species assessed as data deficient.

Idiosepiida

Octopuses
There are 34 octopus species assessed as data deficient.

Umbrella octopuses

Argonautids
Argonauta cornuta

Cirroteuthids

Grimpoteuthis species

Sepioloida
There are 142 species in Sepioloida assessed as data deficient.

Sepiids

Sepiolids

Sepiadariids

Oegopsina species
There are 104 Oegopsina species assessed as data deficient.

Mastigoteuthidae

Enoploteuthids

Hooked squids

Chiroteuthids

Cranchiids

Octopoteuthids

Other Oegopsina species

Bathyteuthida

Cnidaria
There are 166 species in the phylum Cnidaria assessed as data deficient.

Hydrozoa
Millepora braziliensis
Millepora nitida

Anthozoa
There are 164 species in the class Anthozoa assessed as data deficient.

Tube-dwelling anemones
Arachnanthus oligopodus

Zoanthinaria

Actinaria

Alcyonacea

Scleractinia
There are 145 species in the order Scleractinia assessed as data deficient.

Acroporids

Oculinids

Poritids

Mussids

Pectiniids

Siderastreids

Other Scleractinia species

Arthropods
There are 2875 arthropod species and 17 arthropod subspecies assessed as data deficient.

Arachnids

Branchiopoda
Streptocephalus kargesi

Millipedes

Maxillopoda
Maxillopoda includes barnacles, copepods and a number of related animals. There are 22 species in the class Maxillopoda assessed as data deficient.

Sessilia
Armatobalanus nefrens
Balanus aquila

Calanoida
There are 19 species in the order Calanoida assessed as data deficient.

Diaptomids

Temorids
Epischura massachusettsensis

Harpacticoida
Thermomesochra reducta

Xiphosura

Malacostracans
Malacostraca includes crabs, lobsters, crayfish, shrimp, krill, woodlice, and many others. There are 1130 malacostracan species and 17 malacostracan subspecies assessed as data deficient.

Isopods
Echinodillo cavaticus
Styloniscus sp. nov.

Decapods
There are 1128 decapod species and 17 decapod subspecies assessed as data deficient.

Parastacids

Gecarcinucids

Atyids

Species

Subspecies

Cambarids

Potamonautids

Pseudothelphusids

Potamids

Palaemonids

Species

Subspecies

Trichodactylids

Spiny lobsters

Lobsters

Slipper lobsters

Reef lobsters

Other decapod species

Insects
There are 1702 insect species assessed as data deficient.

Blattodea
Miriamrothschildia zonatus

Orthoptera
There are 50 species in the order Orthoptera assessed as data deficient.

Acridids

Tettigoniids

Phaneropterids

Other Orthoptera species

Hymenoptera
There are 316 species in the order Hymenoptera assessed as data deficient.

Colletids

Melittids

Apids

Halictids

Andrenids

Megachilids

Mantises

Lepidoptera
Lepidoptera comprises moths and butterflies. There are 87 species in the order Lepidoptera assessed as data deficient.

Pyralids

Swallowtail butterflies

Lycaenids

Nymphalids

Skippers

Other Lepidoptera species

Beetles
There are 377 beetle species assessed as data deficient.

Geotrupids

Longhorn beetles

Click beetles

Erotylids

Scarabaeids

Other beetle species

Odonata
Odonata includes dragonflies and damselflies. There are 868 species in the order Odonata assessed as data deficient.

Platystictids

Chlorogomphids

Argiolestids

Chlorocyphids

Isostictids

Platycnemidids

Megapodagrionids

Gomphids

Cordulegastrids

Corduliids

Calopterygids

Coenagrionids

Euphaeids

Macromiids

Lestids

Aeshnids

Libellulids

Polythorids

Other Odonata species

Echinoderms
There are 244 echinoderm species assessed as data deficient.

Sea cucumbers

See also 
 Lists of IUCN Red List data deficient species
 List of least concern invertebrates
 List of near threatened invertebrates
 List of vulnerable invertebrates
 List of endangered invertebrates
 List of critically endangered invertebrates
 List of recently extinct invertebrates

References 

Invertebrates
Data deficient invertebrates